In the 2015 CONCACAF Gold Cup, the main disciplinary action taken against players comes in the form of red and yellow cards.

Any player picking up a red card is expelled from the pitch and automatically banned for his country's next match, whether via a straight red or second yellow. After a straight red card, FIFA will conduct a hearing and may extend this ban beyond one match. If the ban extends beyond the end of the finals (i.e. if a player is sent off in the match in which his team was eliminated), it must be served in the team's next competitive international match(es). In most cases, that will be the first matches of 2018 FIFA World Cup qualifying.

Disciplinary statistics
Total number of yellow cards: 45
Average yellow cards per match: 3.75
Total number of red cards:  2
Average red cards per match: 0.17
First yellow card: Jean Alexandre (Haiti against Panama)
First red card: Luis Henríquez (Panama against Honduras)
Fastest yellow card from kick off: 9 minutes (Jean Alexandre; Haiti against Panama and Joel Campbell; Costa Rica against El Salvador)
Fastest yellow card after coming on as substitute: 3 minutes (Andre Boucaud; Trinidad and Tobago against Guatemala)
Latest yellow card in a match without extra time: 90+2 minutes (David Guzmán; Costa Rica against El Salvador)
Fastest dismissal from kick off: 76 minutes (José Manuel Contreras; Guatemala against Mexico)
Fastest dismissal of a substitute: 
Latest dismissal in a match without extra time: 90 minutes (Luis Henríquez; Panama against Honduras)
Least time difference between two yellow cards given to the same player: 3 minutes (José Manuel Contreras; Guatemala against Mexico)
Most yellow cards (team): 6 (Panama and Guatemala)
Most red cards (team): 6' (Panama and Guatemala)
Fewest yellow cards (team): 1 (Jamaica and the United States)
Most yellow cards (player): 1 (16 players tied)
Most red cards (player): 1 (Luis Henríquez and José Manuel Contreras)
Most yellow cards (match): 6 (4 games tied)
Most red cards (match): 1 (Honduras against Panama and Guatemala against Mexico)
Fewest yellow cards (match): 0 (Mexico against Cuba)
Most cards in one match: 6 yellow cards; 1 red card (Honduras against Panama and Guatemala against Mexico)

Detailed statistics

By match

By referee

By team

By player
Updated through Match 10

1 red card

 Luis Henriquez

2 yellow cards

 Nikolas Ledgerwood
 Samuel Piette
 Jean Alexandre
 Adolfo Machado
 Andre Boucaud

1 yellow card

 David Edgar
 Joel Campbell
 David Guzman
 Johan Venegas
 Darwin Cerén
 Alexander Larin
 Alexander Mendoza Espinales
 Richard Menjivar
 Carlos Ruiz
 Jean Sony Alcénat
 Wilde-Donald Guerrier
 Duckens Nazon
 Brayan Beckeles
 Jorge Claros
 Johnny Palacios
 Je-Vaughn Watson
 Armando Cooper
 Anibal Godoy
 Jaime Penedo
 Luis Tejada
 Radanfah Abu Bakr
 Daneil Cyrus
 Khaleem Hyland
 Kenwyne Jones
 John Brooks

References

External links

Disciplinary Record